is a Japanese chemical company whose products include chemicals, agrochemicals and pharmaceuticals. Nippon Soda is a member of the Mizuho keiretsu.

Subsidiaries
In 2012, Nippon Soda acquired 100% of MSSA Chemical Company (formerly known as Métaux Spéciaux), a French maker of sodium and related by-products with a factory in  Saint-Marcel, Savoie, France.

References

External links
 Official global website 

Chemical companies based in Tokyo
Pharmaceutical companies based in Tokyo
Companies listed on the Tokyo Stock Exchange
Chemical companies established in 1920
Japanese brands
Japanese companies established in 1920